A streetsweeper is either a person's occupation or a machine that cleans streets.

Streetsweeper may also refer to:
Street sweeper (shotgun) a variant of the Armsel Striker, a type of automatic or semi-automatic shotgun
Streetsweepers Entertainment, label specialized in releasing street mixtapes
The Streetsweeper, Vol. 1, 2003 album by DJ Kay Slay
Its title track, "The Streetsweeper"
The Streetsweeper, Vol. 2, 2004 album by DJ Kay Slay
"Street Sweeper", a bonus track from Gunna's 2020 album Wunna

See also
Street Sweeper Social Club, an American rap/rock supergroup